Jenö Carl Andreas Kundler (born 10 December 1970) is a Swedish actor. He studied in Malmö 1994–97.

Selected filmography
 Besvärliga människor (2001)
 Beck – Annonsmannen (2002)
 Berglunds begravningar (2003)
 Lasermannen (2005)
 Lögnens pris (2007)
 Sami Blood (2016)

References

External links

Swedish male actors
1970 births
Living people